Orocrambus harpophorus is a moth in the family Crambidae. It was described by Edward Meyrick in 1882. It is endemic to New Zealand. The species has been recorded from the South Island and North Island.

The wingspan is 25–29 mm.

References

Crambinae
Moths described in 1882
Moths of New Zealand
Endemic fauna of New Zealand
Taxa named by Edward Meyrick
Endemic moths of New Zealand